Thessalonike (353 or 352 – 295 BC) was a Macedonian princess, the daughter of King Philip II of Macedon by his Thessalian wife or concubine, Nicesipolis. History links her to three of the most powerful men in Macedon—daughter of King Philip II, half-sister of Alexander the Great and wife of Cassander.

Life
Thessalonike was born around 353 or 352 BC. To commemorate the birth of his daughter, which fell on the same day as the armies of Macedon and Thessalian league won the significant battle of Crocus Field in Thessaly over the Phocians, King Philip is said to have proclaimed, "Let her be called victory in Thessaly". In the Greek language her name is made up of two words Thessaly and nike, that translates into 'Thessalian Victory'. Her mother did not live long after her birth and upon her death Thessalonike appears to have been brought up by her stepmother Olympias. In memory of her close friend, Nicesipolis, the queen took Thessalonike to be raised as her own daughter. Thessalonike was, by far, the youngest child in the care of Olympias. Her interaction with her older brother Alexander would have been minimal, as he was under the tutelage of Aristotle in "The Gardens Of Midas" when she was born, and at the age of six or seven when he left on his Persian campaign.  She was only twenty-one when Alexander died.

Thus favored, she spent her childhood in the queen’s quarters, to whose fortunes she attached herself when the latter returned to Macedon in 317 BC, and with whom she took refuge, along with the rest of the royal family, in the fortress of Pydna, on the advance of Cassander in 315 BC. The fall of Pydna and the execution of her stepmother threw her into the power of Cassander, who embraced the opportunity to connect himself with the Argead dynasty by marrying her. Thessalonike became queen of Macedon and the mother of three sons, Philip, Antipater, and Alexander; and her husband paid her the honour of conferring her name upon the city of Thessaloniki, which he founded on the site of the ancient Therma, and which soon became, as it continues down to the present day, one of the most wealthy and populous cities of Macedonia. After the death of Cassander, Thessalonike appears to have at first retained much influence over her sons. Her son Philip succeeded his father, but while Antipater was the next in line for the throne, Thessalonike demanded that it be shared between Philip and Alexander. Antipater, becoming jealous of the superior favour which his mother showed to his younger brother Alexander, put his mother to death, in 295 BC.

The legend of Thessalonike
Thessalonike is the focus of a popular Greek legend which describes a mermaid who lived in the Aegean for hundreds of years who was thought to be Thessalonike.

The legend states that Alexander, in his quest for the Fountain of Immortality, retrieved with great exertion a flask of immortal water with which he bathed his sister's hair. When Alexander died his grief-stricken sister attempted to end her life by jumping into the sea. Instead of drowning, however, she became a mermaid who passes judgment on mariners throughout the centuries and across the seven seas. To the sailors who encounter her, she always poses the same question: "Is king Alexander alive?" (Greek: Ζει ο βασιλιάς Αλέξανδρος;), to which the correct answer would be "He lives and reigns and conquers the world" (Greek: Ζει και βασιλεύει, και τον κόσμο κυριεύει!).  Given this answer, she would allow the ship and her crew to sail safely away in calm seas. Any other answer would transform her into the raging Gorgon, bent on sending the ship and every sailor onboard to the bottom of the sea.

Notes

References

External links 
 Thessalonike The Tragic Queen at Ancient Worlds (archived)
 Thessalonike at lysimachos.com (archived)
 The pedigree of Thessalonice of Macedonia
 

295 BC deaths
4th-century BC Macedonians
4th-century BC Greek women
Alexander the Great in legend
Family of Alexander the Great
Ancient Macedonian queens consort
People who died under the coregency of Antipater II
Murdered royalty of Macedonia (ancient kingdom)
Ancient Macedonian princesses
Mermaids
340s BC births